The Spot-naped Butterflyfish (Chaetodon oxycephalus), also known as the pig-face butterflyfish, is a species of marine ray-finned fish. a butterflyfish belonging to the family Chaetodontidae. It is found in the Indo- West Pacific region from Sri Lanka to Queensland, north to Indonesia and the Philippines.

The body is white with thin vertical lines on the sides and a large black area in the upper back. Very similar to the Lined Butterflyfish (C. lineolatus), its vertical black eyestripe is broken above the eye and there are additional black and orange lines and spots in the yellow dorsal and caudal fins.

The Spot-naped Butterflyfish belongs to the large subgenus Rabdophorus which might warrant recognition as a distinct genus. In this group, it seems to be member of a lineage also containing species such as the Lined Butterflyfish, or the peculiar Black-wedged Butterflyfish (C. falcula) and Pacific Double-saddle Butterflyfish or "False Falcula" (C. ulietensis). These four differ wildly in shape, but all have bluish vertical lines on a white body with yellow behind, and black on back and caudal peduncle in addition to the typical eyestripe of Chaetodon. The Blue-cheeked Butterflyfish (C. semilarvatus) seems to be a far more basal lineage of Rabdophorus relative to them, but it also has the tell-tale blue vertical lines.

C. oxycephalus is found in coral-rich areas and clear waters of seaward reefs at 10–40 m depth. It feeds on coral polyps and sea anemones.

References

External links
 

Chaetodon
Fish of Palau
Fish described in 1853